Arabluy may refer to:
 Arabluy-e Bisheh
 Arabluy-e Darreh
 Arabluy-e Yekan